Black Creek Township is an inactive township in Shelby County, in the U.S. state of Missouri.

Black Creek Township was erected in the 1834, taking its name from Black Creek.

References

Townships in Missouri
Townships in Shelby County, Missouri